Felipe Dylon (born July 23, 1987) is a Brazilian pop singer. His debut self-titled album was certified gold by ABPD and contained the song "Musa do Verão", an early 2000s hit in Brazil.

Discography

Albums
2002 Felipe Dylon
 "Deixa Disso"
 "Pura Pressão"
 "Me Liga"
 "Onda Perfeita"
 "Mais Perto de Mim"
 "D+"
 "Não"
 "Só Penso em Você"
 "Hoje a Noite Não Tem Luar"
 "Qual Vai Ser"
 "Musa do Verão"
 "Vem Ficar Comigo"

2004 Amor de Verão
 "Pé na Estrada"
 "Um Amor de Verão"
 "Shock"
 "Nunca Ninguém"
 "Eu Quero Você Pra Mim"
 "Sem Você Nada é Igual (No Puedo Olvidar)"
 "Faço Tudo Para Você Me Notar"
 "Ciúme de Você"
 "Deixa Disso"
 "Musa do Verão"
 "Mais Perto de Mim (Close to Me)"

2006 Em Outra Direção
 "Acorda Brasil"
 "Dona da Praia"
 "Quero Você (Te Necessito)"
 "Por Tudo Que Eu Tenho"
 "Vai Ver o Sol Nascer"
 "Todo Mundo"
 "Logo no Primeiro Dia"
 "Dorme Nua"
 "Bússola da Intuição"
 "Odeio Amar Você"
 "Você É o Paraíso"
 "Ano Novo Lunar"
 "Em Outra Direção"
 "Em Outra Direção" (bonus track; music video)

Singles

DVD
2003 Nas Internas
 "Deixa Disso"
 "Musa do Verão"
 "Onda Perfeita"
 "Só Penso rm Você (I'm All About You)"
 "Qual Vai Ser (Keep on Movin')"
 "Pura Pressão"

References

External links
 Felipe Dylon Photos

1987 births
Living people
Brazilian pop guitarists
Brazilian male guitarists
Brazilian pop singers
21st-century Brazilian male singers
21st-century Brazilian singers
21st-century guitarists